Wiesław Ryszard Gołas (Polish: ['vʲε.swav 'gɔ.was]; 9 October 1930 – 9 September 2021) was a Polish actor and Armia Krajowa soldier. He was cast in the role of Tomasz Czereśniak in Czterej pancerni i pies (Polish: Four tank men and a dog), a widely popular TV series set during World War II. He appeared in a number of films, including Ogniomistrz Kaleń (1961) and Dzięcioł (1970).

Filmography
 1954 – Pokolenie
 1956 – Szkice węglem
 1956 – Cień
 1958 – Dezerter
 1958 – Miasteczko
 1958 – Rancho Texas
 1959 – Lotna
 1959 – Tysiąc talarów
 1960 – Zezowate szczęście
 1960 – Przygoda w terenie
 1960 – Hamleś
 1960 – Szklana góra
 1960 – Ostrożnie, Yeti!
 1961 – Dotknięcie nocy
 1961 – Mąż swojej żony
 1961 – Ogniomistrz Kaleń
 1962 – Jak być kochaną
 1962 – Dom bez okien
 1963 – Przygoda noworoczna
 1963 – Naprawdę wczoraj
 1963 – Zacne grzechy
 1963 – Żona dla Australijczyka
 1964 – Prawo i pięść
 1964 – Beata
 1964 – Upał
 1964 – Rękopis znaleziony w Saragossie
 1965 – Kapitan Sowa na tropie
 1965 – Markiza de Pompadour
 1965 – Wózek
 1965 – Trzy kroki po ziemi
 1966–70 – Czterej pancerni i pies
 1966 – Chudy i inni
 1967 – Cześć kapitanie
 1967 – Kwestia sumienia
 1967 – Przeraźliwe łoże
 1968 – Lalka
 1968 – Gra
 1969 – Piąta rano (1969)
 1969 – Nowy
 1970 – Dzięcioł
 1970 – Hydrozagadka
 1970 – Mały
 1970 – Dziura w ziemi
 1971 – Kłopotliwy gość
 1971 – Kareta
 1971 – Niebieskie jak Morze Czarne 
 1972 – Poszukiwany, poszukiwana
 1973 – Droga
 1974 – Czterdziestolatek
 1974 – Potop
 1974 – Nie ma róży bez ognia
 1975 – Kazimierz Wielki
 1975 – Dyrektorzy (1975)
 1976 – Brunet wieczorową porą
 1976 – Zaklęty dwór
 1977 – Wszyscy i nikt'
 1978 – Jarosławna, korolewa Francji (Yaroslavna, koroleva Frantsii),
 1978 – Hallo Szpicbródka czyli ostatni występ króla kasiarzy 1979 – Klincz 1979 – Ród Gąsieniców 1980 – Dzień Wisły 1980 – Alicja 1980 – Polonia Restituta 1981 – Filip z konopi 1981 – Miłość ci wszystko wybaczy 1981 – Gdzie szukać szczęścia? 1982 – Niech cię odleci mara 1982 – Przygrywka 1982 – Polonia Restituta (TV series)
 1982 – Noc poślubna w biały dzień 1982 – Latawiec 1982 – Oko proroka 1983 – Kasztelanka 1983 – Alternatywy 4 1983 – Tajemnica starego ogrodu 1984 – Zabicie ciotki 1984 – Przeklęte oko proroka 1985 – Oko proroka czyli Hanusz Bystry i jego przygody 1985 – Dłużnicy śmierci 1989 – Rififi po sześćdziesiątce 1996 – Szabla od komendanta ''

References

External links
 
 Wiesław Gołas at the Culture.pl . Retrieved 2015-01-25.

1930 births
2021 deaths
Actors from Kielce
Home Army members
Polish male film actors
Polish male stage actors
Polish cabaret performers
20th-century Polish male actors
Knights of the Order of Polonia Restituta
Recipients of the Gold Medal for Merit to Culture – Gloria Artis
20th-century Polish  male singers
Child soldiers in World War II